Belaya Rus ("White Ruthenia", "White Rus") is a brand of vodka, launched in the US in 2012 by Gvardia LLC and distilled in Belarus  from a blend of premium hard winter wheat (25%) and rye (75%) using pure artesian water drawn from wells  deep. It is distilled six times and filtered with patented method using black flint or "Cremia". The alcohol content of this spirit is 40%, (eighty proof), priced similarly to Smirnoff and Svedka.

Meaning of the name and its translation
Belaya Rus literally translates as White Rus',  a name that has historically been applied to a part of the wider region of Ruthenia comprising the northern part of Ukraine, the north-western part of Russia, Belarus and some eastern parts of Poland and Slovakia.

History
In 2010, vodka have received kosher certification from Chief Rabbi of Russia Berel Lazar. Minsk Kristall distillery was founded by brothers Rakovshchiks in 1893 with 24 employees at that time, with over 800 employees in 2011.

Awards

New York International Spirits Competition
2013 Double Gold Medal and "Rye Vodka of the Year"

International Review of Spirits Competition: Beverage Tasting Institute of Chicago
2011 Silver Medal and "Best Buy" Award with "Highly Recommended" ratings (89 points)

Other International Competitions 
Best Belarusian Product of the Year in Russia 2006"
Best product of the Year 2003"

References

External links
Belaya Rus Vodka Facebook Page
Belaya Rus Vodka www.belayarusvodka.com 
2013 New York International Spirits Competition Results
2011 Beverage Testing Institute Results 

Belarusian vodkas
Belarusian brands
Alcoholic drink brands